China competed at the 2020 Winter Youth Olympics in Lausanne, Switzerland from 9 to 22 January 2020.

China competes in 14 events and have 53 competitors. At the end of the games, it bags home 10 medals (3 gold, 3 silver and 4 bronze).

It was the final rehearsal for China to stage the winter games since Beijing is the host city of the 2022 Winter Olympics which was held from 4 to 20 February 2022.

Medalists

Alpine skiing

Boys

Girls

Biathlon

Boys

Girls

Mixed

Cross-country skiing 

Boys

Girls

Curling

China qualified a mixed team of four athletes.

Mixed team

Mixed doubles

Figure skating

Two Chinese figure skaters achieved quota places for China based on the results of the 2019 World Junior Figure Skating Championships.

Singles

Pairs

Mixed NOC team trophy

Freestyle skiing 

Ski cross

Slopestyle & Big Air

Ice hockey

Mixed NOC 3x3 tournament

Luge

Boys

Short track speed skating

Three Chinese skaters achieved quota places for China based on the results of the 2019 World Junior Short Track Speed Skating Championships.

Boys

Girls

Mixed

Qualification Legend: FA=Final A (medal); FB=Final B (non-medal)

Skeleton

Ski jumping

Girls

Ski mountaineering

Individual

Sprint

Mixed

Ski-snowboard cross

Team

Snowboarding

Snowboard cross

Halfpipe, Slopestyle, & Big Air

Speed skating

One Chinese skaters achieved quota places for China based on the results of the 2019 World Junior Speed Skating Championships.

Boys

Girls

Mass Start

Mixed

See also
China at the 2020 Summer Olympics

References

2020 in Chinese sport
Nations at the 2020 Winter Youth Olympics
China at the Youth Olympics